Simple Truth or Simple Truths may refer to:

 Simple Truth, a private-label brand owned by Kroger
 The Simple Truth: A Concert for Kurdish Refugees, a 1991 fundraising concert
 The Simple Truth, a 1998 crime novel by David Baldacci
 Simple Truths, a 2004 album by The Holmes Brothers
 Simple Truths, a book publisher acquired by Sourcebooks

See also 
 These Simple Truths